Abell–Gleason House is a historic home located at Charlottesville, Virginia. It was built in 1859, and is a two-story, three bay, Greek Revival style brick dwelling. Each of the bays is defined by brick pilasters with Doric order inspired capitals faced with stucco. Also on the property is a contributing four room servants quarters.

It was listed on the National Register of Historic Places in 2001. It is located in the Charlottesville and Albemarle County Courthouse Historic District.

References

Houses on the National Register of Historic Places in Virginia
Greek Revival houses in Virginia
Houses completed in 1859
Houses in Charlottesville, Virginia
National Register of Historic Places in Charlottesville, Virginia
Individually listed contributing properties to historic districts on the National Register in Virginia